Events in the year 1993 in Germany.

Incumbents
President - Richard von Weizsäcker
Chancellor – Helmut Kohl

Events

 January 18: Focus publishes its first issue.
 February 11: A man hijacks Lufthansa Flight 592.
 April 23: The 1993 World Horticultural Exposition begins in Stuttgart. 
 May 28: Solingen arson attack of 1993.
 June 25-27: The first annual Düsseldorfer Jazz-Rally is held.

Elections

 Hamburg state election, 1993

Film

 43rd Berlin International Film Festival
 6th European Film Awards

Music

 Germany in the Eurovision Song Contest 1993

Births
17 August - Cinta Laura, Indonesian-German actress and singer
22 June - Loris Karius, footballer
22 August - Laura Dahlmeier, biathlete

Deaths

 January 15 – Annemarie von Gabain, German linguist (born 1901)
 January 21 – Leo Löwenthal, German sociologist (born 1900)
 January 26 – Baron Axel von dem Bussche, German military officer, member of the anti-Hitler Resistance (born 1919)
 February 5 – Hans Jonas, German philosopher (born 1903)
 March 20 – Polykarp Kusch, German-born American physicist, Nobel Prize laureate (born 1911)
 June 7 – Dražen Petrović, Croatian professional basketball player (born 1964)
 June 12 – Wilhelm Gliese, astronomer (born 1915)
 September 20 – Erich Hartmann, German World War II fighter pilot, highest-scoring fighter ace in world history (born 1922)
 November 18 – Fritz Feld, German actor (born 1900)
 December 7 – Wolfgang Paul, German physicist, Nobel Prize in Physics laureate (born 1913)

References

 
Years of the 20th century in Germany
1990s in Germany
Germany
Germany